Although there were attorneys-general that served the Colony of Sierra Leone, the Office of the Attorney General and Ministry of Justice that still stands today was first established in 1961. It would not combine with the Ministry of Justice until 1978 when the country's constitution was amended. The office is responsible for prosecuting all offenses in the name of the Republic of Sierra Leone. The Solicitor General and the Director of Public Prosecutions are two sub-units of the Office of Attorney General and Ministry of Justice.

List of attorneys-general and ministers of justice (post-independence from the UK in 1961) 

 Victor Bert Grant (c. 1957–1961)
 Berthan Macaulay (1963-1967) []
 Abu Aiah Koroma (1967-1971)
 James Emmanuel Mahoney (1972) [Acting]
 Luseni Brewah (1972-1975)
 Solomon Pratt (1976-1977)
 Abu Kamara (1978-1982)
 Francis Minah (1983-1987)
 Abdulai Conteh (1987-1991)
 J. B. Dauda (1991-1992)
 Arnold Bishop-Gooding (1993-1994)
 Claude Campbell (1995-1996)
 Solomon Berewa (1996-2002)
 Eke Ahmed Halloway (2002-2004)
 Frederick Carew (2004-2006)
 Abdul Serry-Kamal (2007-2010)
 Frank Kargbo (2010-2015)
 Joseph Fitzgerald Kamara (2016-2018)
 Charles Margai (2018)
 Priscilla Schwartz (2018-2020) []
 Anthony Yiehwoe Brewah (2020–present)

See also 

 Justice ministry
 Politics of Sierra Leone

References

External links

Attorneys-general of Sierra Leone
Justice ministries